Roque Marciano (English: Martian Rock) is the second album by Detonautas, released in 2004 by Warner Bros. Records.

Track listing

 "Amanhã" 
 "Nada Vai Mudar" 
 "O Dia Que Não Terminou"
 "Mercador Das Almas"
 "Só Por Hoje"
 "Com Você"
 "Silêncio"
 "Meu Bem"
 "Tênis Roque"
 "Tô Aprendendo A Viver Sem Você"
 "Send U Back"

Credits 
 Tico Santa Cruz - Vocals
 Renato Rocha - Lead guitars, backing vocals
 Rodrigo Netto - Rhythm guitars, backing vocals
 Cléston - DJ
 Fábio Brasil - Drums

References

2004 albums
Detonautas Roque Clube albums